Mari Spirito is an American curator based in Istanbul and New York. She is the Founding Director and curator of Protocinema, a non-profit arts organization realizing site-aware exhibitions around the world, in cities including Istanbul, New York, Tbilisi, Paris, Seoul, New Delhi, Moscow, East Lansing, Basel, and Lima.

Career 
After receiving her BFA at Massachusetts College of Art and opening a gallery in a loft with her roommates, Spirito began her New York City-based career at 303 Gallery in New York City, where she was director from 2000 to 2012. In 2011, she founded Protocinema, a mission-driven art organization that creates opportunities for emerging and established artists from all regions, in cities where their work has yet to have much exposure. Many exhibitions are presented outside of existing structures, in abandoned spaces, parks, and garages. Spirito said to ArtSpace, that Protocinema is a way to "link cultures and create conditions for empathy, and it's site-aware because it's sympathetic to context."

The name 'Protocinema' was inspired by Werner Herzog and a statement he made in his film Cave of Forgotten Dreams: "Why do these drawings show the beast with eight legs instead of four legs? Maybe this is man's first attempt to represent motion, maybe this is protocinema." For Spirito, Protocinema is "about how we understand and then represent the world; how we communicate it to each other, and then what the result of that communication has the potential to be. Ultimately, if art can break down stereotypes, misunderstanding, miscommunications, which I believe it can, then that is at the core of everything that we're doing."

Spirito was an advisor to the second Mardin Biennial in Turkey, in 2012. In 2014, the gallery Artspace, in Sydney, Australia, invited Spirito as a guest curator to represent a range of Turkish independent, not-for-profit and museum sectors. From 2014-2018, Spirito programmed Art Basel's 'Conversations' program, a series of discussions between renowned artists and curators, in both Basel and Miami Beach. Convening the likes of Marina Abramovic, Arthur Jafa, Sheikha Hoor al Qasimi, Glenn Ligon and Claudia Rankin, Spirito felt that, "the most important thing is to have different points of view. The panelists need to be challenging each other and pushing to extract something that's important and meaningful."

In 2015, Protocinema launched its Emerging Curator Series at 5533, an independent contemporary art space in Istanbul in the 1950s Han Building. "[Owners] Nancy Akakan and Volkan Aslan don't want to run an exhibition space, so every year they invite another curator to run the space, and for 2015/2016 they've invited me," said Spirtio to ArtSpace. Calling her project Proto5533, the program became a yearlong series of exhibitions by emerging artists and curators, accompanied by a mentoring system and public programs.

From 2015 through 2017, Spirito served as director and curator of 'Alt' ('below' in Turkish), an art space opened in January 2016 on the site of the historic Bomonti Beer Factory in Istanbul's Şişli district. A subterranean art space, Alt presented visual arts, performance and public programs. The space launched with the first solo exhibition of Rodney Graham in Turkey and a group exhibition titled 'If you can't go through the door, go through the window''' with works by Aykan Safoğlu, Hasan Özgür Top, and Hera Büyüktaşçıyan.

In 2017, Spirito was an International Advisory Committee member for the Inaugural High Line Plinth Commissions, one of 13 artists, curators, and art world professionals who each submitted recommendations of artists to invite to submit a proposal for the High Line Plinth, a landmark destination for major public art commissions in New York City located on the High Line at West 30th Street and 10th Avenue.

Spirito is associate curator of visual arts for the Onassis Cultural Center in Athens and New York. In 2018, Spirito curated a program called Nature of Justice, which was a visual arts interpretation of The Birds, the play by Aristophanes, produced in partnership with St. Ann's Warehouse, which ran May 2–13, 2018. The show featured works by artists Machine Dazzle, Louise Lawler, Sofia Stevi and Theo Triantafyllidis.

Sprito is also a member of Independent Curators International (ICI), a New York City-based organization that has produced exhibitions, events, publications, research and training opportunities for curators and diverse audiences around the world since 1975. In 2012, Spirito, along with Övül Durmuşoğlu, was awarded the SAHA Research Award for the project Ancient Works / Asar-ı Atika, a one-week research project at The Museum of Anatolian Civilizations in Ankara, Turkey with artists Akram Zaatari, Nilbar Güres, and Rossella Biscotti. The resulting work was Rossella Biscotti's The City, a five-channel video installation visiting the 9,000 year old neolithic archeological site Çatalhöyük, which was presented in a subterranean space near Taksim Square from September 29-October 27, 2018. Spirito was also one of several professionals who developed ICI's inaugural Curatorial Intensive in Bangkok, Thailand, developed in partnership with the Faculty of Fine and Applied Arts at Chulalongkorn University.

Sprito was a jury member for the 2018 Beirut Art Residency. Also in 2018, Alserkal Programming appointed Hale Tenger for a commissioned public intervention that was guest curated by Spirito, and was launched at Alserkal Avenue during Dubai Art Week in March. The resulting work, Under, 2018'', was on display from March 19–May, 2018 in The Yard in Dubai, United Arab Emirates.

Spirito is Vice President of the Board of Participant Gallery in New York City. She is also currently on the Advisory Board of Collectorspace in Istanbul, and has served on the Board of Directors of New York Art Dealers Alliance.

References

American art curators
American women curators
Massachusetts College of Art and Design alumni
American expatriates in Turkey
Living people
Year of birth missing (living people)
21st-century American women